Lewinella lacunae  is a Gram-negative, aerobic, rod-shaped bacterium from the genus of Lewinella.

References

External links
Type strain of Lewinella lacunae at BacDive -  the Bacterial Diversity Metadatabase
	

Bacteroidota
Bacteria described in 2017